The 2nd Regiment Massachusetts Volunteer Infantry was an infantry regiment in the Union Army during the American Civil War. Major George H. Gordon (later Brigadier General), a West Point graduate and veteran of the Mexican–American War, organized the unit's recruitment and formation. The 2nd Massachusetts was trained at Camp Andrew in West Roxbury, Massachusetts on the site of the former Transcendentalist utopian community, Brook Farm. Roughly half the regiment was mustered in on May 18, 1861 and the remainder on May 25, 1861 for a term of three years. The regiment saw extensive combat as part of the Army of the Potomac particularly during the Battle of Antietam and the Battle of Gettysburg.

Organization and early service
Under the direction of Major George H. Gordon of the Union Army, recruiting offices for the 2nd Massachusetts were opened in Boston immediately after the first group of volunteer regiments departed Massachusetts for Washington. This enthusiasm was quickly dampened and the offices closed due to the fact that Massachusetts had filled its quota and therefore could neither recruit nor send any additional volunteer units until a call was issued by the U.S. War Department. The unit's future second-in-command, Lieutenant Colonel George Leonard Andrews, made a trip to Washington to meet with Secretary of War Simon Cameron and obtained special permission to recruit a new regiment and wait until such time as it would be summoned by the federal government.

Recruiting proceeded and the regiment began training in May 1861 at Camp Andrew in West Roxbury, Massachusetts, just south of Boston. On July 8, the regiment left for Maryland where it joined the forces under General Robert Patterson.

In 1861, the regiment served guarding the upper Potomac River and Frederick, Maryland, and in the spring of 1862, the regiment served under Maj. Gen. Nathaniel P. Banks, unsuccessfully opposing Maj. Gen. Stonewall Jackson in the Shenandoah Valley. In June, the regiment was transferred to the Union Army of Virginia and participated in General Pope"s Northern Virginia Campaign. During this time, Colonel Gordon was promoted to brigadier general and commanded the brigade. Lieutenant Colonel Andrews was promoted to colonel and given command of the 2nd Massachusetts. Major Dwight was promoted to lieutenant colonel.

Battle of Antietam, and early 1863
In August, the regiment became part of the 3rd Brigade (commanded by Gordon), 1st Division (commanded by Major General Alpheus S. Williams), II Corps (commanded by Banks), of Maj. Gen. John Pope's Army of Virginia. On August 9, Banks's Corps fought at the Battle of Cedar Mountain as part of Pope's Northern Virginia Campaign, where the corps was again up against Jackson, and was again defeated, the 2nd Massachusetts suffering 173 casualties. However, the II Corps did not reach the Second Battle of Bull Run until after the battle was over.

On September 17, the II Corps was redesignated as the XII Corps, Army of the Potomac, with the 2nd Massachusetts remaining in the 3rd Brigade of the 1st Division. During the Battle of Antietam, the XII Corps, commanded by Maj. Gen. Joseph K. Mansfield supported General Joseph Hooker's advanced through the cornfield during the morning phase of the battle and received heavy casualties including Lieutenant Colonel Dwight, who was mortally wounded. The regiment lost 12 killed and 51 wounded, among the wounded were Captains Francis and Robert Gould Shaw along with Lieutenants Crowninshield and Mills. General Mansfield was also killed in the battle and command of the XII Corps passed to General Henry W. Slocum.

Later in the year, they marched to Fredericksburg, Virginia, but did not participate in the Battle of Fredericksburg. During this time, at Stafford Court House, Captain Shaw left the regiment to become colonel of the 54th Massachusetts Infantry.

In May, 1863, the regiment participated in the Battle of Chancellorsville. In the battle, Stonewall Jackson's corps executed a surprise flanking movement and smashed into the right flank of the Army of the Potomac, severely damaging the unsuspecting XI Corps. The neighboring troops, including the XII Corps with the 2nd Massachusetts, entrenched hastily and was able to stop the Confederate advance before it overran the entire army.

Battle of Gettysburg
After Chancellorsville, the regiment marched north to Pennsylvania following General Robert E. Lee's Army of Northern Virginia. It participated in the Battle of Gettysburg. On July 3, the third day of the battle, it made an attack against the Confederate troops at the base of Culp's Hill, near Spangler Spring. The regiment's commander, 23-year-old Lieutenant Colonel Charles R. Mudge, replied to the order to attack, "Well it is murder, but it's the order." In the charge a bullet struck Mudge just below the throat and killed him instantly. The regiment suffered 137 casualties in the assault. After the battle, the regiment was sent to New York City to help end the Draft Riots that were going on. Cpt. Charles Fessenden Morse of Company B was promoted to lieutenant colonel.

Atlanta
Late in 1863, the XII Corps, with the 2nd Massachusetts included, along with the XI Corps was placed under the command of General Joseph Hooker and sent west to join the Army of the Cumberland. Hooker's two Corps played a decisive role in the Battle of Wauhatchie, which opened up the "Cracker Line" to the besieged Union army, and seized Lookout Mountain in the famed "Battle Above The Clouds" during the early stages of the Battle of Chattanooga. In 1864, it participated in General William T. Sherman's Atlanta Campaign.  Later, the XI Corps and XII Corps were combined to form the XX Corps. It participated in the Battle of Kennesaw Mountain, The Battle of Peachtree Creek and the Siege of Atlanta. In September, it was part of the forces the occupied Atlanta, with Lt. Col. Morse serving as provost marshal of the city.

March to the sea
In November, the 2nd Massachusetts was part of Sherman's March to the Sea. The regiment was in Raleigh, North Carolina, when General Joseph E. Johnston's Confederate army surrendered to Sherman on April 26, 1865. The regiment was mustered out in July. The 2nd Massachusetts Regiment lost during service 14 Officers and 176 Enlisted men killed and mortally wounded and 2 Officers and 96 Enlisted men by disease for a total of 288.

Monuments
There is a monument to the 2nd Massachusetts at Gettysburg which was erected in 1879. It is positioned on Colgrove Avenue near Spangler's Meadow. The monument was the first regimental monument placed on what is widely considered the "battlefield" today.

Form the tablet on the front of the monument:

From the hill behind this monument on the morning of July 3, the Second Massachusetts Infantry made an assault upon the Confederate troops in the works at the base of Culp's Hill opposite. The regiment carried to the charge 22 officers and 294 enlisted men. It lost 4 officers and 41 enlisted men killed and mortally wounded and 6 officers and 84 enlisted men wounded. To perpetuate the honored memories of that the survivors of the Regiment have raised this stone 1879.

From the rear:

Lieut. Col. Charles R. Mudge Captain Thomas B. Fox Captain Thomas R. Robeson Lieut. Henry V.D. Stone
Color bearers - Leavitt C. Durgin, Rupert J. Sadler, Stephen Cody
First Sergeant Alonzo J. Babcock, Sergeant William H. Blunt.
Corporals
Charles Burdett, Theodore S. Butters, Jeremiah S. Hall, Patrick Heoy, Ruel Whittier, Gordon S. Wilson.
Privates
Samuel T. Alton, George M. Baily, Henry C. Ball, Wallace Bascom, John Briggs, Jr., David B. Brown, William T. Bullard, James A. Chase, Peter Conlan, John Derr, James T. Edmunds, William H. Ela, John E. Farrington, Silas P. Foster, Willard Foster, Joseph Furber, Fritz Goetz, Daniel A Hatch, John J. Jewett, John Joy, Charles Kiernan, William Marshall, Frederick Maynard, Andrew Nelson, Rufus A. Parker, Philo H. Peck, Sidney S. Prouty, Richard Seavers, Charles Trayner, David L. Wade

One of the two lion sculptures flanking the grand staircase at the Boston Public Library is dedicated to the Second Massachusetts. The plinth it rests on lists their engagements. The lion is by Louis St Gaudens and was funded by surviving members of the regiment in the early 1890s.

Popular culture
The advance of the 2nd Massachusetts through Miller's Cornfield during the Battle of Antietam is portrayed at the beginning of the 1989 film Glory.

Later units
The 211th Military Police Battalion claims lineage from the 2nd Massachusetts and other militia units. As of 2019, the battalion was active as an element of the Massachusetts National Guard.

See also

 List of Massachusetts Civil War units
 Massachusetts in the Civil War

Notes

References

External links
 
 Civil War Reference - 2nd Massachusetts Regiment
 Acton Memorial Library Civil War Archives
 
 

Military units and formations established in 1861
Military units and formations disestablished in 1865
Units and formations of the Union Army from Massachusetts
1861 establishments in Massachusetts